Gymnostemon is a monotypic genus of plants in the family Simaroubaceae. The sole species, Gymnostemon zaizou, is  semi-deciduous forest tree. It is endemic to Côte d'Ivoire and threatened by habitat loss throughout its native range of the Sassandra River Basin. G. zaizou is a commercial hardwood species that is well-adapted to the heavy rainfall of western Africa.  Wood from this species of tree is also used locally to make barred percussion instruments.

References

Simaroubaceae
Monotypic Sapindales genera
Endemic flora of Ivory Coast
Trees of Africa
Vulnerable flora of Africa
Taxonomy articles created by Polbot
Taxa named by François Pellegrin
Taxa named by André Aubréville